"Accelerate" is a song by American singer Christina Aguilera and was released as the lead single from her eighth studio album Liberation (2018). It features guest vocals from singer Ty Dolla Sign and rapper 2 Chainz. The song was produced by Kanye West alongside Che Pope, Mike Dean and Eric Danchick, with co-production from Honorable C.N.O.T.E. and Charlie Heat. "Accelerate" became Aguilera's tenth number-one song on the US Billboard Dance Club Songs chart.

Recording
Ty Dolla Sign recalled the studio recording process in the Rolling Stone interview: "She [Aguilera] invited me to her crib to come finish the record. It was dope. We just went in there and I just heard her do her shit live in person. I was like 'What the fuck is this? It’s incredible!'"

Critical reception
Jon Caramanica of The New York Times called "Accelerate" "fantastically weird", stating, "Ty Dolla Sign's moans and yelps, sinuous keyboard lines, a charmingly staccato verse from 2 Chainz. Somewhere in there is Ms. Aguilera, under-singing and trying not to get pushed into a corner. And yet despite these disparate inputs, there's something loose and admirable happening here: everyone is trying new things, and the disarray verges on flamboyance." According to MTV's Sam Prance, "Accelerate" is one of Aguilera's "most experimental releases to date," as well as "an instantly memorable pulsating club bop." Billboard called the single "a stormy comeback" with high energy, while The Guardian regarded it as catchy and a "promising comeback", noting Aguilera's "incredible" vocals. The Fader  praised Aguilera for "brave artistic choice"  and assured that upon listening deeper into the song, its weirdest and most interesting sounds become "addictive". Brock Radke of Las Vegas Magazine believed "Accelerate" is a "pulsating, rhythmic track" that "defies categorization and reaffirms Aguilera’s dedication to pushing past pop boundaries".

Sheldon Pearce of Pitchfork said it is "certainly a liberation from something, though it's unclear what. There's a fun song (or two) trapped in here somewhere, between several mutations, but without any sort of constancy or meaningful direction, it isn't much of a song at all; it's a series of disjointed episodes with superfluous parts. 'Accelerate' is unnecessarily mixing and inflating ideas when far less would do." Hugh McIntyre, a contributor to Forbes, was critical of the song, saying "'Accelerate' sounds like it's headed somewhere, but it never actually arrives. The track is disappointingly one-note, and once you've heard what it has to give in the first few seconds, there isn't a lot more to discover. The drum-heavy production immediately catches the ear, but it never develops and grows, and there's no powerful hook that requires a replay".

The British magazine i-D ranked the song on a list of the Best Pop Comebacks of the 21st Century.

Chart performance
In the United States, the song peaked at number twenty-four on the Bubbling Under Hot 100. Elsewhere, the song had minor chart success, reaching the top ten in Spain's digital component chart. In the United Kingdom and Canada, the song charted on the digital sales component charts in each country, although in the UK it also reached number 99 on the biggest singles of midweek list compiled by the Official Charts Company. "Accelerate" became Aguilera's tenth number-one song on the US Billboard Dance Club Songs chart. It also peaked at number thirteen on the German Black Chart.

Music video

An accompanying music video for "Accelerate", directed by Zoey Grossman, premiered via Aguilera's YouTube channel on May 3, 2018. Ty Dolla Sign and 2 Chainz do not appear in the video.

Additionally, a vertical video for the song was released exclusively via Spotify on the same day.

Live performances
On May 31, 2018 Pandora Radio hosted a listening party as a preview for a then-upcoming album Liberation. Aguilera sang parts of "Accelerate" during the meeting with journalists. On June 9 she performed the track, along with "Fall in Line", at the Genentech Gives Back benefit concert in San Francisco. The next day she made a surprise appearance during the Los Angeles Pride Parade. Her performance of a dance remix of "Accelerate" featured a group of drag queens. The song was then included in the setlist for three of Aguilera's tours: The Liberation Tour (2018), Christina Aguilera: The Xperience (2019–2020), and The X Tour (2019).

Charts

Weekly charts

Year-end charts

References

2018 singles
2018 songs
Christina Aguilera songs
Ty Dolla Sign songs
2 Chainz songs
RCA Records singles
Song recordings produced by Kanye West
Song recordings produced by Mike Dean (record producer)
Songs written by Christina Aguilera
Songs written by Kanye West
Songs written by 2 Chainz
Songs written by Ty Dolla Sign
Songs written by Ilsey Juber
Songs written by Mike Dean (record producer)
Songs written by Bibi Bourelly
Songs written by Tayla Parx
Songs written by Kirby Lauryen
Vertically-oriented music videos